Beauval is a commune in the Somme department in Hauts-de-France in northern France.

Geography

Population

Places and monuments
 Magnificent church; the interior has been used as the backdrop to some French films.
 The War Memorial

See also
Communes of the Somme department

References

Communes of Somme (department)